Aïcha Adjouri,, often known as Keltoum (كلثوم), was an Algerian actress. She is regarded as one of the greatest Algerian actresses of all time. She was born on 2 April 1916 in Blida, and died on 11 November 2010.

Career
She was discovered by playwright Mahieddine Bachtarzi in 1935, and participated in about 20 films and more than 70 plays. Keltoum joined the Algiers Opera House when it was founded in 1947, where she played the main roles.

Her outstanding performance in The Winds of the Aures, as a mother looking for her son after his arrest by French army was highly praised by critics. The film which directed by Mohammed Lakhdar-Hamina, won Best First Work in the 1967 Cannes Film Festival.

Filmography

References

External links
 

People from Blida
Algerian actresses
1916 births
2010 deaths
People from Algiers
21st-century Algerian people